"The Bottom Line" is a song by English alternative dance band Big Audio Dynamite, released as both a 7" and 12" single from their debut studio album, This Is Big Audio Dynamite (1985). It was written, and produced by Mick Jones, his debut single with a band singing lead vocals since being fired from the Clash in 1983. Whilst not a hit in their home country, peaking at No. 97 on the UK Singles Chart, it was a Top 40 hit in Australasia, peaking at No. 34 on Australia's ARIA Singles Chart, and No. 38 on New Zealand's Recorded Music NZ chart.

The 12" version of the song at the full length of 8:40 is the definitive version of the song, featuring parts one, and two. Part one is a slightly longer than the album version, and part two is the extended "rap" alluded to on the album version when it fades with "I'm gonna take you to part two."

In 1990, "The Bottom Line" was remixed and used as the title track for the adventure comedy film, Flashback, starring Dennis Hopper and Kiefer Sutherland. However, this track was not included on the film's official soundtrack.

Single cover
The single's cover depicts most of the band dressed in cowboy clothing as a four piece band, minus keyboardist Dan Donovan who took and designed the photo.

Track listing
7" single
"The Bottom Line" – 4:35
"BAD" – 6:25

12" single
"The Bottom Line" – 8:40
"BAD" – 6:40

Chart performance

A"The Bottom Line" and "BAD" charted together on the Billboard Hot Dance Club Play chart.

References

External links
 

1985 songs
1985 singles
Big Audio Dynamite songs
Songs written by Mick Jones (The Clash)
Song recordings produced by Mick Jones (The Clash)
CBS Records singles